Elections in the Republic of India in 1991 included the general election, elections to seven state legislative assemblies and to seats in the Rajya Sabha.

General Election

Legislative Assembly elections

Assam

Haryana

|- align=center
!style="background-color:#E9E9E9" class="unsortable"|
!style="background-color:#E9E9E9" align=center|Political Party
!style="background-color:#E9E9E9" |No. of candidates
!style="background-color:#E9E9E9" |No. of elected
!style="background-color:#E9E9E9" |Number of Votes
!style="background-color:#E9E9E9" |% of Votes
|-
| 
|align="left"|Indian National Congress||90||51||2,084,856||33.73%
|-
| 
|align="left"|Janata Party||88||16||1,361,955||22.03%
|-
| 
|align="left"|Haryana Vikas Party||61||12||775,375||12.54%
|-
| 
|align="left"|Janata Dal||25||3||277,380||4.49%
|-
| 
|align="left"|Bharatiya Janata Party||89||2||582,850||9.43%
|-
| 
|align="left"|Bahujan Samaj Party||26||1||143,611||2.32%
|-
| 
|align="left"|Independents||1412||5||848,527||13.73%
|-
|
! Total !! 1885 !! 90 !! 6,181,187 !!
|-
|}

Kerala

Pondicherry

Tamil Nadu

|-
! style="background-color:#E9E9E9;text-align:left;vertical-align:top;" |Alliance/Party
!style="width:4px" |
! style="background-color:#E9E9E9;text-align:right;" |Seats won
! style="background-color:#E9E9E9;text-align:right;" |Change
! style="background-color:#E9E9E9;text-align:right;" |Popular Vote
! style="background-color:#E9E9E9;text-align:right;" |Vote %
! style="background-color:#E9E9E9;text-align:right;" |Adj. %‡
|-
! style="background-color:#009900; color:white"|AIADMK+ alliance
! style="background-color: " | 
| 225
| +172
| 14,738,042
| colspan=2 style="text-align:center;vertical-align:middle;"| 59.8%
|-
|AIADMK
! style="background-color: #008000" |
| 164
| +137
| 10,940,966
| 44.4%
| 61.1%
|-
|INC
! style="background-color: #00FFFF" |
| 60
| +34
| 3,743,859
| 15.2%
| 56.2%
|-
|ICS(SCS)†
! style="background-color: #800000" |
| 1
| +1
| 53,217
| 0.2%
| 56.1%
|-
! style="background-color:#FF0000; color:white"|DMK+ alliance
! style="background-color: " |
| 7
| -164
| 7,405,935
| colspan=2 style="text-align:center;vertical-align:middle;"| 30.0%
|-
|DMK
! style="background-color: #FF0000" |
| 2
| -148
| 5,535,668
| 22.5%
| 29.9%
|-
|TMK
! style="background-color: #FF00FF" |
| 2
| -1
| 371,645
| 1.5%
| 31.0%
|-
|CPI(M)
! style="background-color: #000080" |
| 1
| -14
| 777,532
| 3.2%
| 31.2%
|-
|JD
! style="background-color: #FFFF00" |
| 1
| +1
| 415,947
| 1.7%
| 28.3%
|-
|CPI
! style="background-color: #0000FF" |
| 1
| -2
| 305,143
| 1.2%
| 29.9%
|-
! style="background-color:gray; color:white"|Others
! style="background-color:gray" |
| 2
| -8
| 2,505,431
| colspan=2 style="text-align:center;vertical-align:middle;"| 10.2%
|-
|PMK
! style="background-color: #800080" |
| 1
| +1
| 1,452,982
| 5.9%
| 7.0%
|-
|JP
! style="background-color: " |
| 0
| -4
| 51,564
| 0.2%
| 0.7%
|-
|IND
! style="background-color: #666666" |
| 1
| -5
| 390,227
| 1.6%
| 1.7%
|-
| style="text-align:center;" |Total
! style="background-color: " |
| 234
| –
| 24,649,408
| 100%
| style="text-align:center;" | –
|-
|}
†: ICS(SCS) contested in 13 different constituencies, but only the one contested by Sanjay Ramaswamy was endorsed by AIADMK.‡: Vote % reflects the percentage of votes the party received compared to the entire electorate that voted in this election. Adjusted (Adj.) Vote %, reflects the % of votes the party received per constituency that they contested.
Sources: Election Commission of India

Uttar Pradesh

West Bengal

Rajya Sabha

References

External Links
 

1991 elections in India
India
1991 in India
Elections in India by year